Go Soeda was the two-time defending champion but chose not to compete.

Klahn won the title, defeating Yang Tsung-hua in the final, 6–2, 6–3.

Seeds

Draw

Finals

Top half

Bottom half

References
 Main Draw
 Qualifying Draw

Royal Lahaina Challenger - Singles
2014 Singles